The 55th Assembly District of the Wisconsin is one of 99 districts in the Wisconsin State Assembly.  Located in east-central Wisconsin, the district comprises most of the northern quarter of Winnebago County and part of southern Outagamie County.  It includes all of the city of Neenah and western parts of the city of Appleton, as well as the village of Fox Crossing.  It also contains the Appleton campus of the Fox Valley Technical College, the Fox Cities Stadium, and the Kimberly Point Lighthouse. The district is represented by Republican Nate Gustafson, since January 2023.

The 55th Assembly District is located within Wisconsin's 19th Senate district, along with the 56th and 57th Assembly districts.

List of past representatives

References 

Wisconsin State Assembly districts
Outagamie County, Wisconsin
Winnebago County, Wisconsin